Holocola thalassinana is a moth of the family Tortricidae. It is known from Australia.

The larvae feed on Leptospermum species, (including Leptospermum laevigatum) and Melaleuca quinquenervia.

References

Eucosmini